Independence Public School District (usually referred to as the Independence School District, acronym is the ISD) is a school district headquartered in Independence, Missouri, United States. The district serves most of Independence and Sugar Creek.

Schools

 High schools
William Chrisman High School
Truman High School
Van Horn High School

 Alternative schools
Independence Academy

 Middle schools
Pioneer Ridge
George Caleb Bingham
James Bridger
Clifford H. Nowlin

Elementary schools
Abraham Mallinson
Thomas Hart Benton
Blackburn
Bryant
Fairmount
Glendale
Korte (originally North Rock Creek)
Little Blue
John W. Luff
Mill Creek
Christian Ott
Alexander Procter
Randall
Santa Fe Trail
Spring Branch
Sugar Creek
Sycamore Hills
Three Trails
William Southern

 Early education
Hanthorn
Sunshine Center

Annexation boundary line debate
In November 2007, the voters of Independence and Kansas City voted for seven schools (one high school, one middle school, and five elementary schools) to be taken over by the Independence Public School District. Jim Hinson, the superintendent of the Independence district, believed that the KCMO district fought the annexation was because it was a "pride issue" and because the KCMO district feared that other parts of the district could secede.

The transfer did not include the C. R. Anderson School, which was originally called the Pitcher School. KCMSD annexed the school in 1957, and it became an alternative school for troubled students in the 1980s. It closed in 2000.

Transfer to Independence School District
 Van Horn High School (Independence)
 Nowlin Middle School (Independence)
 Fairmount Elementary (Independence)
 Mount Washington Elementary  (Independence) (no longer part of the district, was sold)
 North Rock Creek / Korte Elementary (Independence)
 Sugar Creek Elementary (Sugar Creek)
 Three Trails Elementary (Independence)

References

External links

District website

School districts in Missouri
Independence, Missouri
Education in Jackson County, Missouri